Bad Wolf is a British television production company founded by Julie Gardner and Jane Tranter in 2015, with its headquarters in Cardiff, Wales. The company is responsible for the television series The Night Of, Beddgelert, A Discovery of Witches, His Dark Materials and the upcoming era of Doctor Who.

History
The company was founded in 2015 by former BBC executives Julie Gardner and Jane Tranter after leaving BBC Worldwide. During their time at the BBC, they worked with Russell T Davies on the 2005 relaunch of Doctor Who, which was made in Wales. The company name is a homage to the "Bad Wolf" storyline from the relaunched series. In 2015, it signed a first look deal with HBO.

In 2017, the company opened a new film and television studio in Cardiff, named Wolf Studios Wales. That same year, Bad Wolf's first production, The Night Of, was nominated for thirteen Emmys, of which it won five. Later that year, they also received investment from European media conglomerate Sky Group and American network HBO in return for minority stakes in the company.

The first episode of the company's His Dark Materials, which began an adaptation of the book series of the same name, was watched by approximately seven million people. This made the premiere the biggest new British series debut in over five years.

In April 2020, Bad Wolf announced that had commenced work on I Hate Suzie starring Billie Piper, whom Gardner and Tranter's associate Russell T Davies had cast in the major role of Rose Tyler on Doctor Who.

On 24 September 2021, BBC Studios announced that Bad Wolf would become co-producer of Doctor Who itself starting in 2023, following the scheduled departure of the series' current showrunner, Chris Chibnall, who occupied the role from 2017 to 2022. Davies will return to his old role as showrunner, which he had occupied from 2005 to 2010, with Gardner returning as executive producer and Tranter joining also.

In October 2021, it was announced that Sony Pictures Television would acquire a majority of Bad Wolf, acquiring the remaining shares from HBO and Sky plc in December of that year. The deal brought in a new member, Natasha Hale, along with a long-term partnership to produce future productions and boost Cardiff's standing in the entertainment industry.

Productions

Television series

References

External links
 

Sony Pictures Television
Sony Pictures Television production companies
Companies based in Cardiff
Television production companies of the United Kingdom
British companies established in 2015
Mass media companies established in 2015
2015 establishments in Wales
2021 mergers and acquisitions
British subsidiaries of foreign companies